Dangerous Lady was a four-part British mini-series TV drama, which aired on ITV and was based on Martina Cole's 1992 novel of the same name. The series premièred in 1995 and starred Sheila Hancock, Jason Isaacs, Susan Lynch and Owen Teale. Each episode lasted 60 minutes and was a Warner Sisters production for the ITV network.

Plot

The story of a family of West End gangsters of Irish descent in 1960s post-war London, and the secret love affair between Maura, who rises to become one of the leading gangsters of her day, and Terry Patterson, a policeman. The story opens in May 1950, with the birth of Maura Ryan. The plot covers the exploits of the Ryan family up to the mid-1980s, culminating in the death of Michael Ryan and the arrest of Maura. The saga spans 30 years and contains all the elements of a typical mobster family: Protection rackets, sleazy Soho nightclubs, gold bullion heists, violent criminals and bloody and brutal exterminations.

Main cast

 Sheila Hancock as Sarah Ryan
 Jason Isaacs as Michael Ryan
 Susan Lynch as Maura Ryan
 Owen Teale as Terry Patterson
 Cal Macaninch as Geoff Ryan
 James Bowers as Roy Ryan
 Philip Wright as Garry Ryan
 John Thomson as Lee Ryan
 Frank Grimes as Benjamin Ryan
 Caroline Trowbridge as Janine

DVD release

The Dangerous Lady DVD was released 26 July 2005 by the Select O Hits Video studio

2012 stage adaptation

A stage version of Dangerous Lady opened at the Theatre Royal Stratford East, London, her third to be presented at the Royal Stratford, to positive reviews.
The play ran from Friday 19 October 2012 - Saturday 17 November 2012.

References

External links

1990s British crime television series
ITV television dramas
Television series by ITV Studios
1995 British television series debuts
1995 British television series endings
1990s British drama television series
1990s British television miniseries
English-language television shows
Television shows produced by Central Independent Television
Television shows based on British novels
Television shows set in London